The White Rock Mountains are a north-northwest trending mountain range located in eastern Lincoln County, Nevada with the eastern slopes of the range extending into Beaver and Iron counties of Utah. The north end of the range merges with the Wilson Creek Range on the west.

To the east the Hamlin Valley bounds the range with the Indian Peak Range of Utah beyond. To the southeast the range merges with the Paradise Mountains of the Nevada–Utah border area. Spring Valley State Park and the Eagle Reservoir lie in the Spring Valley along the southwest margin of the range. The community of Ursine is about two miles downstream from the Eagle Reservoir.

The Camp Valley separates the main portions of the White Rock and Wilson Creek ranges and continues to the southeast to form  the northeast headwaters of Meadow Valley Wash through Spring Valley/Eagle Valley.

The White Rock caldera associated with this range was the site of one of the Large volume volcanic eruptions in the Basin and Range Province.

The range was named from the white color of the rocks which form it.

References 

Mountain ranges of Lincoln County, Nevada
Mountain ranges of Nevada
Volcanoes of Nevada